Pintalia is a genus of cixiid planthoppers in the family Cixiidae. There are at least 50 described species in Pintalia.

Species
These 55 species belong to the genus Pintalia:

 Pintalia acarinata Caldwell, 1944 c g
 Pintalia albolineata Muir, 1934 c g
 Pintalia alta Osborn, 1935 c g
 Pintalia aspersa (Fowler, 1904) c g
 Pintalia castanea Metcalf, 1946 c g
 Pintalia chromata Caldwell, 1944 c g
 Pintalia consobrina Stal, 1862 c g
 Pintalia contra Caldwell, 1944 c g
 Pintalia curvivitta Fennah, 1945 c g
 Pintalia daedala Fennah, 1945 c g
 Pintalia damalis Fennah, 1971 c g
 Pintalia decorata (Uhler, 1895) c g
 Pintalia delicata (Fowler, 1904) c g b
 Pintalia discoidalis Lethierry, 1890 c g
 Pintalia dominicana Fennah, 1948 c g
 Pintalia erecta Metcalf, 1938 c g
 Pintalia falcata Fennah, 1945 c g
 Pintalia fasciatipennis Stal, 1862 c g
 Pintalia fasciolaris (Blanchard, 1852) c g
 Pintalia fraterna Stal, 1862 c g
 Pintalia fumata Caldwell, 1944 c g
 Pintalia geometra Caldwell, 1944 c g
 Pintalia germana (Fowler, 1904) c g
 Pintalia grenadana Fennah, 1948 c g
 Pintalia gurneyi Kramer, 1983 c g
 Pintalia inornata Stal, 1862 c g
 Pintalia insularis Osborn, 1935 c g
 Pintalia lateralis Stal, 1862 c g
 Pintalia lineata Caldwell, 1944 c g
 Pintalia maculata (Fowler, 1904) c g
 Pintalia marginata Caldwell, 1944 c g
 Pintalia marmorata Fennah, 1945 c g
 Pintalia martorelli Caldwell, 1951 c g
 Pintalia metcalfi O'Brien, 1987 c g
 Pintalia mettacta O'Brien, 1987 c g
 Pintalia nemaculata Caldwell, 1951 c g
 Pintalia neoaspersa Caldwell, 1944 c g
 Pintalia obliquivitta Fennah, 1945 c g
 Pintalia obscuripennis Stal, 1862 c g
 Pintalia osborni Caldwell, 1944 c g
 Pintalia pictipennis Stal, 1862 c g
 Pintalia procellata (Uhler, 1901) c g
 Pintalia proxima Stal, 1862 c g
 Pintalia pseudomaculata Caldwell, 1944 c g
 Pintalia punctata Caldwell, 1944 c g
 Pintalia quadrimaculata Fennah, 1945 c g
 Pintalia sanctae-luciae Fennah, 1948 c g
 Pintalia stigmata Caldwell, 1944 c g
 Pintalia straminea Fennah, 1945 c g
 Pintalia supralta Caldwell, 1951 c g
 Pintalia tacta (Fowler, 1904) c g
 Pintalia ustulata Stal, 1862 c g
 Pintalia variegata (Fabricius, 1803) c g
 Pintalia vibex Kramer, 1983 c g b
 Pintalia vomerifera Fennah, 1945 c g

Data sources: i = ITIS, c = Catalogue of Life, g = GBIF, b = Bugguide.net

References

Further reading

External links

 

Auchenorrhyncha genera
Cixiidae